The 1937 Gonzaga Bulldogs football team was an American football team that represented Gonzaga University as an independent during the 1937 college football season. In their seventh year under head coach Mike Pecarovich, the Bulldogs compiled a 2–6–2 record and were outscored by a total of 138 to 44.

Schedule

References

Gonzaga
Gonzaga Bulldogs football seasons
Gonzaga Bulldogs football